D. giganteum may refer to:
 Deinotherium giganteum, an extinct mammal species
 Dissanthelium giganteum, a grass species in the genus Dissanthelium

See also
 Giganteum